Mark Cameron (born 31 January 1981) is an Australian former cricketer who played Australian domestic cricket for New South Wales. He is a right-handed batsman and a right-arm fast bowler. Cameron was drafted into the squad for the Australia A tour of India in September 2008. He later left New South Wales to play for Western Australia and the Perth Scorchers, but retired without playing a game for either team due to injury.

See also
 List of New South Wales representative cricketers

External links
NSW Blues Official Site – Player Profile
Cricinfo Official Site – Player Profile

1981 births
Living people
Australian cricketers
New South Wales cricketers
Cricketers from New South Wales